The 1993 Spanish motorcycle Grand Prix was the fourth round of the 1993 Grand Prix motorcycle racing season. It took place on 2 May 1993 at the Circuito de Jerez.

The weekend was marred by a practice accident which resulted in the death of Japanese rider Nobuyuki Wakai after he had struck a spectator who had entered the pit lane without authorization.

500 cc race report
Kevin Schwantz’ 4th pole in 4 races.

Wayne Rainey takes the start from Schwantz and Alex Barros.

Schwantz and Rainey get a gap from Àlex Crivillé, Mick Doohan, with Barros closing.

Barros up to 3rd, and then arrives to Schwantz and Rainey.

Schwantz waves his teammate Barros through to 2nd, then Barros takes the lead from Rainey.

Barros and Schwantz get a gap, but Schwantz makes a mistake and goes into the grass. He saves it and remains in 2nd.

Barros in 1st and has a large lead with a couple of laps to go, but lowsides out of the race.

500 cc classification

250 cc classification

References

Spanish motorcycle Grand Prix
Spanish
Motorcycle Grand Prix